Jorvik Radio is a local radio station based in the city of York, in North Yorkshire. Its studios are based in Burnholme, York. It takes its name from Jorvik, the historic Viking name for York.

The station launched at 07:00 on the 4th of November 2019; the first song played on air was Shed Seven's 'Disco Down'.

Programming 
As a local radio service, Jorvik Radio originates all of its own programming. Programming is designed to be eclectic in nature, and to reflect the diverse nature of the York community. The station's Key Commitments state that it must broadcast "community based programming covering sports, the arts, commerce, current affairs, diversity and faith".

Transmission 
The station broadcasts via FM, on a frequency of 94.8 MHz with an ERP of 100 watts, as well as online. Its transmitter site is located on a residential building to the west of the city centre.

References 

Radio stations in the United Kingdom
Radio stations in Yorkshire
Radio stations established in 2019
Community radio stations in the United Kingdom